Hong Mi-sun (born ) is a South Korean female volleyball player.

She was part of the South Korea women's national volleyball team at the 2003 FIVB World Grand Prix, and at the 2008 Asian Beach Games.

Clubs 

  Korea Tobacco & Ginseng (2002–2004)

References 

1983 births
Living people
South Korean women's volleyball players